Bonyhád is a district in southern part of Tolna County. Bonyhád is also the name of the town where the district seat is found. The district is located in the Southern Transdanubia Statistical Region.

Geography 
Bonyhád District borders with Tamási District to the north, Szekszárd District to the east, Mohács District, Pécsvárad District and Pécs District (Baranya County) to the south, Komló District and Hegyhát District (Baranya County) to the west. The number of the inhabited places in Bonyhád District is 25.

Municipalities 
The district has 2 towns and 23 villages.
(ordered by population, as of 1 January 2013)

The bolded municipalities are cities.

See also
List of cities and towns in Hungary

References

External links
 Postal codes of the Bonyhád District

Districts in Tolna County